The Wombats Proudly Present A Guide to Love, Loss & Desperation, usually shortened to A Guide to Love, Loss & Desperation, is the debut major studio album by English rock band the Wombats. It was released by 14th Floor Records on 5 November 2007. Most of the songs first appeared on the band's 2006 Japan-only album Girls, Boys and Marsupials. A DVD to accompany the album includes footage of the band at the South by Southwest festival, along with music videos from their recent singles.

The album was recorded at Rockfield Studios and reached No. 11 in the UK Albums Chart. It contains a pregap before the first track, which contains the band attempting to make wine glasses "ring" and extolling the virtues of the French wine Beaujolais, ending with them performing a mock advert for Beaujolais. The album had sold 335,361 copies in the UK as of April 2015.

Track listing

Personnel
 Matthew Murphy – vocals, guitar, synthesizers, piano
 Dan Haggis – backing vocals, drums, synthesizers, piano, stylophone, harmonica, melodica
 Tord Øverland-Knudsen – backing vocals, bass, synthesizers, cello
 Llangattock Primary School – kids choir on "Let's Dance to Joy Division"
 Ian McNabb - banjo

Charts and certifications

Weekly charts

Year-end charts

Certifications

References

External links
 The Wombats' official website

The Wombats albums
2007 debut albums
Albums recorded at Electric Lady Studios